Naperville Community Unit School District 203 is a school district headquartered in Naperville, Illinois, United States.

About 
Naperville Community Unit School District 203 serves central and northern Naperville as well as portions of the neighboring Lisle and Bolingbrook. The oldest District 203 building still in use is Ellsworth Elementary, constructed in 1928, while the newest is the Ann Reid Early Childhood Center, opened in 2010.

District 203 has two high schools: Naperville Central High School and Naperville North High School, five junior high schools and fifteen elementary schools within Naperville city limits. Additionally, the school district has one junior high and one elementary school in Lisle.

Early childhood

Elementary schools

Junior high schools

High schools

Formerly Called Naperville Community High School

References

External links
 Naperville Community Unit School District 203
 The City of Naperville

School districts in DuPage County, Illinois
Education in Naperville, Illinois
Lisle, Illinois
Bolingbrook, Illinois
School districts established in 1972
1972 establishments in Illinois